Nat A Lo Jo A Ma is a 2019 Burmese comedy television series. It aired on MRTV-4, from July 31 to August 27, 2019, on Mondays to Fridays at 20:45 for 20 episodes.

Cast
 Hein Yatu as Wai Yan Moe Myaw
 Hsaung Wutyee May as Ngwe Kyar
 Kyar Si as Shwe Kyar
 Yoon Shwe Yi as Hla Hla Lone
 Nyein Chan as U Moe Myaw
 Shin Min Thu as Thiri Moe Myaw
 Aung Thaw as Nga Dain
 Myaut Shone as Nga Daung
 Aung Maw as Du Wai Wai

References

Burmese television series
MRTV (TV network) original programming